VCC–Clark is an elevated station on the Millennium Line of Metro Vancouver's SkyTrain rapid transit system. The station is named after the nearby Vancouver Community College (VCC) located in Vancouver, British Columbia, Canada and serves as the western terminus of the Millennium Line.

History
VCC–Clark station's original plans called for it to be located underground below Broadway to the south of Vancouver Community College, but the City of Vancouver wanted the line to run to the north through an emerging technology zone on the False Creek Flats.

The station was originally planned to open with the original portion of the Millennium Line in 2002, but the construction was delayed because of property issues as the station is located in a former railyard. Service at the station was slated to begin in the fourth quarter of 2005, but testing and commissioning of the station and related facilities continued during that time frame, with trial running of trains starting in mid-November that year. The station, designed by the architecture firms Francl Architecture and Stantec Architecture, officially opened in 2006. A limited-stop bus route, the 84, connects VCC–Clark to UBC to relieve the 99 B-Line bus route and the trolley buses on Broadway.

Plans originally called for the Millennium Line to extend west along the Broadway corridor from VCC–Clark station to Granville Street and 10th Avenue with three additional stations. In 2006, it was revealed that this  extension would be placed on hold while priority was given to the Canada Line and Evergreen Extension. In 2018, a  extension west to Arbutus Street was approved with an estimated completion date of 2026.

Station information

Station layout

Entrances
VCC–Clark station is served by a single entrance located at the west end of the station. The entrance is located on the Keith Drive north of 6th Avenue.

Transit connections

VCC–Clark station is served by one bus connection: an express route to the University of British Columbia.

References

Millennium Line stations
Railway stations in Canada opened in 2006
Buildings and structures in Vancouver
2006 establishments in British Columbia